Robert 'Bob' James McCaskill (27 September 1895 – 23 June 1952) was an Australian rules footballer who played for Richmond in the Victorian Football League (VFL) during the 1920s and coached both North Melbourne and Hawthorn.

Early life

Born in Cobram in 1895, McCaskill spent his childhood growing up around Numurkah near Shepparton, Victoria. It was here that he learnt to play the cornet. He was also a fast running wingman and in 1914 his team, Shepparton, lost the Goulburn Valley Football League grand final.

In December 1915 with the fighting in Europe during World War I McCaskill enlisted in Shepparton only to be discharged in May 1916 for synovitis of the knee. He was issued with the service number 36704. He travelled to Royal Park in Melbourne in September 1916 to enlist again with the Australian Army. He was passed fit on this occasion. He fought in Europe rising to the rank of Sergeant. He returned to Australia in June 1919.

Playing career
After the war McCaskill returned to Shepparton where he re-established his business. He began to play football again after a time spend as an umpire. Strong performances while playing for Shepparton in the GVFL he was under the attention of the Richmond Club. At the age of 27 he got a permit to play with Richmond in June 1923.  McCaskill was a centreman while at Richmond and played finals football in 1924 with his side eventually finishing second in that year's unique round robin format.

After leaving Richmond he accepted a position at the Bendigo YMCA as secretary. Richmond refused to clear him so he stood out of football for the year.

McCaskill joined Sandhurst,  but he wasn't allowed to play the first year of his coaching. He had a lot of success as coach in the  Bendigo Football League club, leading them to premierships in 1927, 1929, 1930, 1931, 1932, 1933, 1934, 1939 & 1940.

Coaching career
The outbreak of the Second World War, he again enlisted in 1940 and led the Southern Command Band at Royal Park and later became an Army Amenities Officer. This meant he relocated to Melbourne and the  club offered him their coaching position. For 1941 and some of 1942 he was the honorary coach of North Melbourne. Warrant Officer McCaskill was relocated interstate by the Army and the job went to Bill Findlay as his replacement. Bob returned to Melbourne and returned to the coaching position for 1944. They finished the 1945 home and away season in third but lost to Carlton in the first Semi Final thus being eliminated. In 1947 became the first to coach 100 games for the club.

He finished his coaching career with a stint at Hawthorn, McCaskill walked into a meeting in the Club's secretary office and announced "Gentlemen, I've decided that I am going to be the coach of Hawthorn Football Club".

The first decision McCaskill made was to change the jumper from brown with a gold vee to brown and gold vertical stripes, he thought that the change would make the players look bigger and huskier.
McCaskill as coach also wanted to make changes to the playing group, starting with Kevin Curran to be captain. Outgoing captain-coach Alec Albiston was angry as he was told by a member of the board that he would remain as captain. Brownlow Medallist Col Austen sided with Albiston and a split occurred. The board sided with the new coach and gave Albiston and Austen open clearances. Without the club’s best two players, the team did not win a match in 1950 but won 4 in 1951.

Late in 1951 McCaskill's health began to fail, in and out of hospital he wasn't well enough to continue coaching, his assistant Jack Hale was appointed caretaker coach in the hope Bob would recover. He died at home on 23 June 1952.

Outside Football

A musically gifted man, he could play the cornet. McCaskill was recorded as a Bandmaster when he enlisted with The Army. Later in life McCaskill lead the Bendigo Citizens Band to an Australian championship.

References

External links

VFL Coaches - R McCaskill

1895 births
Richmond Football Club players
North Melbourne Football Club coaches
Hawthorn Football Club coaches
Australian rules footballers from Victoria (Australia)
1952 deaths
Shepparton Football Club players
Sandhurst Football Club players
Australian military personnel of World War I
Australian Army personnel of World War II
Australian Army soldiers